The GG Archives is a large, privately held archive of genealogy, military, and other ephemera dating from the mid-1800s through 2000. The site has over 6,000 static web pages and 20,000 images. The archives are composed of artificial collections of ephemera in twelve topical areas. The site has since received numerous awards.

Based in Atlanta, Georgia, the GG Archives supplies free, unrestricted access to historical ephemera, articles, and photographs for specific topics—primarily genealogy-related materials intended for genealogists, historians, teachers, and researchers, covering the period of the 1880s through the 1950s. They are funded mostly through contextual advertising.

Launched in January 2000, their online collections include US immigration, ocean travel, military (mostly US Navy), epicurean, vintage fashions, Works Progress Administration (WPA), and the Spanish flu pandemic of 1918-19.

The site includes many original steamship passage tickets or contracts, primarily for transatlantic voyages, between 1854 and 1956. The unique primary source documents are useful for illustrating family histories and for K–12 students studying history and social studies.

Known for their passenger lists, they also itemize (with images) the materials they have for each ship in the "Immigrant Ships" section under "Ocean Travel". One can expect to spend copious amounts of time on this site while traversing its many collections of historical documents and ephemera.

Primary source materials can be found throughout the Archives' Immigration section (covers US and  Canadian immigration) including passenger lists and immigrant inspection cards, and are often used by schools in a number of settings and topics.

They also cover vintage fashions and epicurean lifestyles from past eras and many period articles on most topics, including a Q&A on the World War I draft.

Major collections 
Based on their top navigation links, the Archives' major collections include:

Immigration (US immigration through primary and other sources): The Gjenvick-Gjønvik Archives records the immigrant experience through essential documents, articles and information on the mass migration of immigrants from primarily European countries to North America. Immigrant documents, steamship passage tickets, Ellis Island, Castle Garden immigrant stations, immigration laws, and steerage are included in this section.

Ocean Travel – Daily life aboard a steamship. Discover what life was like onboard the steamship through historical articles richly illustrated with photographs and illustrations from the 1870s through the 1950s. Extensive Cunard Line materials, their vintage menus collection, RMS Titanic collections, steamship lines - history and ephemera, sea captains' biographical sketches, ports of call, Student Third Class Association (STCA), and ocean liner and travel brochures can be found under this category.

Military Archives. Collections have focused on the United States Navy, but also include significant materials on World War I and the US Army. They have a large collection of US Naval Training Center graduation yearbooks, primarily Great Lakes and San Diego.

Epicurean. Topics cover the epicurean lifestyle and include foods, desserts, cooking terms, methods, family recipes, vintage ads (epicurean), vintage menus (ocean liners), and wedding feasts.

Vintage Fashions 1880s - 1930s. Women's, teens', and children's clothing styles on board the steamships and while travelling in style and comfort.

Entertainment in the era of steamships & ocean liners. Brochures, flyers, images, and articles focusing on steamships and ocean liners. Much of their focus is on motion picture production in the early 1900s.

Library. Diverse collection of books primarily in reference, genealogy, maritime, and military topics.

Other notable collections: Works Progress Administration (WPA), Influenza Pandemic of 1918-1919, biographies: Dr. Edward Jenner and Thomas A. Edison, and the Bangor Punta Archives.

Collection highlights

 The World War One Draft – photograph recording the first draft lottery of 1917
 Immigrant ID Tag from the Holland-America Line's TSS Rijndam, 26 September 1923
 King George Letter to soldiers of the United States, April 1918
 Black Ball Line Passage Ticket for passage of Mr. Nicholas Fish on the packet ship Yorkshire, 1859. See Black Ball Line.
 World War I Booklet to Discharged Soldiers: "Where Do We Go from Here? This is the Real Dope", by William Brown Meloney
 White Star Line Brochure: "The Famous Big 4 of the New York Liverpool Service"
 Painting of the first cowpox vaccination, Dr. Edward Jenner, by Georges Gaston Melinque

Founder 

Paul K. Gjenvick, MAS, an archivist by trade, has a bachelor's degree in accounting from Minnesota State University and a masters of archival studies from Clayton State University.

References

External links 
 

 Internet properties established in 2000
 Archives in the United States
 American genealogy websites